Paralympic judo is an adaptation of the Japanese martial art of judo for visually impaired competitors. The rules of the sport are only slightly different from regular judo competitions. It has been part of the Summer Paralympics program since 1988 for men and 2004 for women.

Rules
Paralympic judo competition is governed by the International Judo Federation (IJF) rules with some modifications
specified by the International Blind Sports Association (IBSA). The major rule difference is that contests always start with the 2 competitors in a loose grip on each other's Judo suits (grip called "Kumikata") and if contact is broken, "mate"(Wait), or stop, is called and the competitors return to center and regrip.

References

External links
 International Paralympic Committee page on judo
  Judo for blind including details of paralympics 
 Judo for blind athletes
 Info from the British Paralympic Association
 Beijing 2008 Paralympic Judo Information with an Australian slant from accessibility.com.au - includes nomination criteria for the 2008 Australian Paralympic Judo squad.

Judo
Judo
Combat sports